Athletics competitions have been held at the South Asian Games since the inaugural edition of the South Asian Federation Games in 1984 in Kathmandu, Nepal.

South Asian Games

Games records

External links
Athletics medallists from 1984–2004 South Asian Games
South Asian Games Athletics Records

Sports at the South Asian Games
 
South Asian Games
South Asian Games